Edmundo "Eddie" Rodriguez (born April 22, 1970, in Guadalajara, Mexico) is a Mexican retired soccer player. He spent most of his career in the U.S. leagues including two seasons in Major League Soccer.  He has also served as an assistant coach with the University of Tampa women's soccer team.
Edmundo coaches an absolute legendary soccer team in the 05 and 06 MLS next boys team

Youth
Rodriguez spent his youth in Guadalajara before moving to the United States with his family when he was fourteen. In 1991, he entered the University of New Mexico, where he played soccer in 1991 and 1992. In his two seasons with the Lobos, he scored twenty goals in twenty-seven games.  In 1992, he was the MPSF Pacific Division MPV and a first  team All-American. he also set the single season goals record and UNM as well as the point leader in school history

Professional
In 1993, Rodriguez moved back to Mexico, where he played in the Mexican first and second divisions with Chivas and Tecos.  In the summer of 1995, he returned to the United States and signed with the Arizona Sandsharks of the Continental Indoor Soccer League.  That fall, he moved to the Tampa Bay Terror for the 1995–1996 National Professional Soccer League. In February 1996, the MetroStars selected Rodriguez in the first round (second overall) of the 1996 MLS Supplemental Draft. He assisted on the first goal in MetroStars’ history, but never scored a goal or added an assist before being released after eleven games.  He returned to the Terror for the 1996–1997 season.  In February 1997, the San Jose Clash picked up Rodriguez in the third round (24th overall) in the 1997 MLS Supplemental Draft.  The Clash waived him in March.  He then signed with the Kansas City Wizards. Although Rodriguez had begun in the midfield, he moved to backline with the Wizards.  He played sixteen games, scoring one goal.  The Wizards also sent him on loan to the Albuquerque Geckos.  The Wizards waived him in April 1998.  He unsuccessfully attempted to sign with the Tampa Bay Mutiny and ended up playing for the Raleigh Flyers of the USISL that season.  In July 1999, the Express traded Rodriguez to the Charleston Battery in exchange for Mike Mekelburg.  He played fifteen games for the Battery. In the fall of 1999, he returned to the NPSL, this time with the Harrisburg Heat. He would play the next two winter indoor seasons in Harrisburg. On May 9, 2000, he returned to Raleigh, now to play for the Raleigh Capital Express.  In April 2001, he moved to the Atlanta Silverbacks.  He may have also played for the Jacksonville Cyclones in the USISL.

Coach
Rodriguez has spent some time as an assistant coach with the University of Tampa women's soccer team.

References

External links
MetroStars player profile
Ten Years Ago: Worst Metro ever
Future Faces of American Soccer
 

1970 births
Living people
Footballers from Guadalajara, Jalisco
Albuquerque Geckos players
Arizona Sandsharks players
Atlanta Silverbacks players
Charleston Battery players
Continental Indoor Soccer League players
Harrisburg Heat players
Sporting Kansas City players
Major League Soccer players
New York Red Bulls players
Mexican footballers
New Mexico Lobos men's soccer players
National Professional Soccer League (1984–2001) players
Raleigh Flyers players
Raleigh (Capital) Express players
Tampa Bay Terror players
USL Second Division players
A-League (1995–2004) players
New York Red Bulls draft picks
San Jose Earthquakes draft picks
Association football defenders
Association football midfielders
Mexican expatriate footballers
Expatriate soccer players in the United States
Mexican expatriate sportspeople in the United States